Erik Folke Andersson (born 19 August 1971) is a Swedish former professional ice hockey player who played 12 games in the National Hockey League with the Calgary Flames.  First drafted by the Los Angeles Kings in the 6th round of the 1990 NHL Entry Draft, Andersson chose not to sign with LA.  In the 1997 draft, Andersson was selected again, this time in the 3rd round by Calgary.  Andersson played two seasons professionally in North America, mainly in the minor leagues, before returning to Sweden to play in the Elitserien.

Prior to his pro career, Andersson played at the University of Denver.

External links 

1971 births
AIK IF players
Calgary Flames draft picks
Calgary Flames players
Denver Pioneers men's ice hockey players
Indianapolis Ice players
Living people
Los Angeles Kings draft picks
Ice hockey people from Stockholm
Saint John Flames players
Swedish expatriate ice hockey players in the United States
Swedish ice hockey left wingers
Swedish expatriate ice hockey players in Canada
VIK Västerås HK players